Lestinogomphus is a genus of dragonfly in the family Gomphidae. It contains the following species:

Lestinogomphus angustus  – common fairytail, spined fairytail
Lestinogomphus bivittatus 
Lestinogomphus congoensis 
Lestinogomphus matilei 
Lestinogomphus minutus 
Lestinogomphus silkeae

References

Gomphidae
Anisoptera genera
Taxonomy articles created by Polbot